The Matthew Henson Residence is a historic apartment residence at 246 West 150th Street in Manhattan, New York City.  Apartment 3F in this building is where Matthew Henson (1866-1955), the African American polar explorer, lived from 1929 until his death.  Henson was arguably the first man to reach the Geographic North Pole, a feat that is disputed in part by his own diary.  His residence was named a National Historic Landmark in 1975.

Description and history
246 West 150 Street is located in Manhattan's Harlem neighborhood, on the south side of the street east of Frederick Douglass Boulevard.  It is part of the Dunbar Apartments complex, an innovative tenant-owned cooperative housing complex erected in the 1920s.  Its residents over the decades have included a significant number of African Americans important to culture and society.  Apartment 3F was occupied by Matthew Henson from 1929 until his death in 1955.

Matthew Henson was born in 1866 to free people of color in Maryland.  He met Commander Robert E. Peary in 1887, who hired him for exploratory expeditions after learning of seagoing experiences he had as a teenager.  Henson became an indispensable figure in the expeditions Peary led into the Arctic Ocean, assisting with the planning and logistics, as a translator with the local Inuit, and frequently as a groundbreaker in the party's movements.  In 1909, as he was assigned the task of breaking trail in Peary's bid to reach the Geographic North Pole.  The expedition claimed success in this attempt, although later analysis (based in part on descriptions contained in Henson's diary) of the available evidence suggests they actually fell short of the objective.  Although Henson was denied the accolades showered upon Peary after the expedition, he was eventually honored with membership in The Explorers Club in 1937, and was lauded within the African-American community for his achievement, and has since been recognized at both national and state levels.  A plaque marking his achievements is located outside one of the Dunbar building entrances.

See also
List of National Historic Landmarks in New York City
National Register of Historic Places listings in Manhattan above 110th Street

References

External links 
American Memory from the Library of Congress

National Historic Landmarks in Manhattan
Residential buildings on the National Register of Historic Places in Manhattan